Area 14 can refer to:

 Area 14 (Nevada National Security Site)
 Brodmann area 14